Juan Francisco Masdeu (4 October 1744 – 1817), Spanish historian, was born at Palermo. He joined the Company of Jesus on 19 December 1759 and became professor in the Jesuit seminaries at Ferrara and Ascoli. He visited Spain in 1799, was exiled, and returned in 1815, dying at Valencia on 11 April 1817.

His Storia critica di Spagne e della cultura spagnuola in ogni genere (2 vols., 1781–1784) was finally expanded into the Historia crítica de España y de la cultura española (1783–1805), which, though it consists of twenty volumes, was left unfinished; had it been continued on the same scale, the work would have consisted of fifty volumes. Masdeu wrote in a critical spirit and with a regard for accuracy rare in his time; but he is more concerned with small details than with the philosophy of history. Still, his narrative is lucid, and later researches have not yet rendered his work obsolete.

References

External links

18th-century Spanish historians
1744 births
1817 deaths
18th-century Spanish Jesuits
19th-century Spanish historians